Lumpenus lampretaeformis - fish of the family Stichaeidae.
Ophidion barbatum - fish of the family Ophidiidae.
Xiphasia setifer - fish of the family Blenniidae.